Cajon Speedway is a former oval race track near El Cajon, California.

History
Located between Gillespie Field and the San Vicente Freeway a 0.25 mile dirt oval track opened in 1961. Named Cajon Speedway the track expanded to a 0.375 mile dirt track in 1964. As of 1966 the 0.375 mile oval was paved. The track was founded by Earle Brucker Sr. who also founded El Cajon Stock Car Racing Association (ECSCRA). In 1978 the ECSCRA Super Stocks championship was won by Ron Esau. Between 1986 and 2004, local drivers also competed for the Whelen All-American Series crown. John Borneman Jr., father of Johnny Borneman III, won the track championship in 1992. Ricky Johnson won the track championship in 1995.

In 2003, track owner Steve Brucker was murdered at his home in El Cajon. Brucker was able to call 911 before succumbing to his wounds at Sharp Memorial Hospital. Two men were charged with the murder which was the result of an attempted robbery. With the death of Brucker and the speedway lease ending in 2005, the track shut down after the 2004 racing season.

Notable events

USAC National Midget Series

NASCAR Winston West Series

NASCAR Southwest Series

USF2000

References

External links
Cajon Speedway archive at Racing-Reference

Sports venues completed in 1961
Sports venues in San Diego County, California
Defunct motorsport venues in the United States
Sports venues demolished in 2007
Motorsport venues in California
NASCAR tracks